The badminton men's singles tournament at the 2012 Olympic Games in London took place from 28 July to 5 August at Wembley Arena.

The draw was held on 23 July 2012. Forty players from 34 nations competed in the event. China's Lin Dan won the gold medal, defeating Lee Chong Wei from Malaysia in the final. Chen Long, also of China, won the bronze medal.

Competition format

The tournament started with a group phase round-robin followed by a knockout stage.

Seeds

  (silver medallist)
  (gold medallist)
  (bronze medallist)
  (quarter-finals)
  (quarter-finals)
  (quarter-finals)
  (fourth place)
  (group stage)
  (round of 16)
  (group stage)
  (round of 16)
  (round of 16)
  (round of 16)
  (round of 16)
  (group stage)
  (round of 16)

Results

Group stage

Group A

Group B

Group C

Group D

Group E

Group F

Group G

Group H

Group I

Group J

Group K

Group L

Group M

Group N

Group O

Group P

Finals

References

External links
Results at tournamentsoftware.com

Badminton at the 2012 Summer Olympics
Men's events at the 2012 Summer Olympics